White Death is a 1989 video game published by Command Simulations.

Gameplay
White Death is a game in which a computer version of Frank Chadwick's White Death board game is based on the Battle of Velikiye Luki.

Reception
Wyatt Lee reviewed the game for Computer Gaming World, and stated that "For those who desire the detail of a boardgame where the computer both performs the bookkeeping functions and provides a built-in opponent, White Death is an extremely viable choice."

Reviews
Raze - Dec, 1990
Computer Gaming World - Dec, 1991
Tilt

References

1989 video games
Amiga games
Computer wargames
DOS games
Turn-based strategy video games
Video games about Nazi Germany
Video games based on board games
Video games developed in the United States
Video games set in Russia
Video games set in the Soviet Union